Saltos Acima is a village in the northcentral part of the island of Santiago, Cape Verde. It is part  of the municipality of Santa Catarina. In 2010 its population was 657. It is situated 5 km northeast of Assomada. To the north it borders on the settlement Pedra Serrado, which is in the municipality of São Miguel.

References

Villages and settlements in Santiago, Cape Verde
Santa Catarina, Cape Verde